Codex Marshall Or. 6, is a Bohairic, uncial manuscript of the New Testament, on a paper. Palaeographically it has been assigned to the 16th century.

Description 

It contains the text of the Gospel of John on 192 paper leaves (11.3 by 7). The text is written in 1 column per page, 12-14 lines per page.

The manuscript lacks John 5:3.4 (the descent of the angel) and Pericope Adulterae (7:53-8:11). According to Scrivener it is comparatively recent but interesting manuscript.

It has no date recorded. The manuscript was examined by Lightfoot and Headlam. Horner used it in his edition of the Bohairic New Testament.

Currently it is housed at the Bodleian Library (MS Marshall Or. 99) in Oxford.

See also 

 Coptic versions of the Bible
 Biblical manuscript
 Huntington MS 17
 Huntington MS 20
 Codex Marshall Or. 5

References 

Coptic New Testament manuscripts
16th-century biblical manuscripts
Bodleian Library collection